The M109 Group (also known as the NGC 3992 Group or Ursa Major cloud) is a group of galaxies about 55 million light-years away in the constellation Ursa Major.  The group is named after the brightest galaxy within the group, the spiral galaxy M109.

Members

The table below lists galaxies that have been consistently identified as group members in the Nearby Galaxies Catalog, the survey of Fouque et al., the Lyons Groups of Galaxies (LGG) Catalogue, and the three group lists created from the Nearby Optical Galaxy sample of Giuricin et al.

Galaxies frequently but not consistently listed as group members in the above references (i.e. galaxies listed in four of the above lists) include NGC 3631, NGC 3657, NGC 3733, NGC 3756, NGC 3850, NGC 3898, NGC 3985, NGC 3990, NGC 3998, NGC 4217, NGC 4220, UGC 6773, UGC 6802, UGC 6816, UGC 6922, and UGC 6969.  The exact membership and the exact number of galaxies in the group is somewhat uncertain.

Fouque et al. lists these galaxies as two separate groups named Ursa Major I North and Ursa Major I South, both of which were used to compile the above table.  Most other references, however, identify this as a single group, as is specifically noted in the LGG Catalogue.

References

 
Ursa Major Cluster
Ursa Major (constellation)
Virgo Supercluster